The house at 81 Pearl Street in Somerville, Massachusetts is a well-preserved Italianate house.  The -story wood-frame house was built c. 1860, and features a deep front gable with paired decorative brackets, and a front porch supported by square columns, with an unusual scalloped-arch cornice trim.  It is among the best-preserved of the period worker housing built in East Somerville at that time.  An early occupant was Benjamin Gage, a machinist.

The house was listed on the National Register of Historic Places in 1989.

See also
National Register of Historic Places listings in Somerville, Massachusetts

References

Houses on the National Register of Historic Places in Somerville, Massachusetts